Satiri is a department or commune of Houet Province in south-western Burkina Faso. Its capital lies at the town of Satiri.

Towns and villages
The department is composed of the administrative village of Satiri
and fifteen other villages:

References

Departments of Burkina Faso
Houet Province